Robert Tienwen Chien (November 20, 1931  – December 8, 1983) was an American computer scientist concerned largely with research in information theory, fault-tolerance, and artificial intelligence (AI), director of the Coordinated Science Laboratory (CSL) at the University of Illinois at Urbana–Champaign, and known for his invention of the Chien search and seminal contributions to the PMC model in system level fault diagnosis.

Biography
Robert Tienwen Chien was born in Wuxi, Jiangsu, China as the youngest of eight children, and emigrated to the United States in 1952 to continue his technical studies, enrolling at the University of Illinois at Urbana–Champaign.   He received his B.S. in electrical engineering in 1954, and continued graduate studies at Illinois, receiving his A.M in Mathematics in 1957, and his Ph.D. in electrical engineering in 1958.

He worked as a research scientist at IBM's Thomas J. Watson Research Center in Yorktown, New York, then the world's leading site for computing research, where he rose to the position of Group Manager.  While at IBM, he also taught as an adjunct professor at Columbia University, and authored several books on coding theory.   In 1964, he left IBM to join the faculty of the University of Illinois at Urbana–Champaign as an associate professor in electrical engineering, rising to the rank of full professor in 1966.  In 1969, he served as the E. A. Guillemin Visiting Professor at the University of Maryland, and in 1972, he served as a visiting professor at the Massachusetts Institute of Technology.  He was appointed the director of the Coordinated Science Laboratory at Illinois in 1973, a role he held until his death in 1983.

In recognition of his contributions to the University of Illinois and his research, the Electrical and Computer Engineering Department of the University of Illinois annually presents the Robert T. Chien Memorial Award for demonstrated research excellence to a PhD candidate in Electrical Engineering
.
In addition, the Coordinated Science Laboratory (CSL) at the University of Illinois also invites extraordinary researchers to give the Robert T. Chien Distinguished Lecture
 each year.  This series has included several Nobel Laureates, and over a dozen members of the National Academies.  Notably, while CSL director, he created an Outstanding Staff Award, the first such recognition of this type at the University of Illinois.   In appreciation that award also bears his name as the Robert T. Chien Staff Appreciation Award, and is awarded each year to an outstanding staff member selected by the staff.

Contributions in Computer Science
Chien is best known for two seminal contributions, the Chien Search, a fast algorithm for determining the roots of a polynomial over a finite field and a model system-level fault diagnosis, known today as the PMC (Preparata-Metze-Chien) model, which is a main issue in the design of highly dependable processing systems. This model is still the object of intense research today (as attested by the literature).

Awards and affiliations
Chien was affiliated with the following organizations:
 Fellow of the Institute of Electrical and Electronics Engineers
 Board of Governors, IEEE Information Society
 Editorial Board, IEEE Spectrum Magazine
 Trustee, National Electronics Conference

References

1931 births
1983 deaths
American computer scientists
Artificial intelligence researchers
University of Illinois faculty